Michelle Thompson-Fawcett is a New Zealand academic, are Māori, of Ngati Whatua descent and as of 2019 is a full professor at the University of Otago. She is a Fellow of the Royal Society Te Apārangi.

Academic career

After a 1998 PhD titled  'Envisioning urban villages : a critique of a movement and two urban transformations'  at the University of Oxford,  Thompson-Fawcett moved to the University of Otago, rising to full professor in 2017 and in 2022 was appointed distinguished professor at that university.

In March 2021, Thompson-Fawcett was made a Fellow of the Royal Society Te Apārangi, recognising her as a "world-leading expert in advancing contemporary mātauranga Māori and fostering Indigenous approaches to culturally sustainable environmental futures".

Selected works 
 Ancell, Sarah, and Michelle Thompson-Fawcett. "The social sustainability of medium density housing: A conceptual model and Christchurch case study." Housing Studies 23, no. 3 (2008): 423–442.
 Bond, Sophie, and Michelle Thompson-Fawcett. "Public participation and new urbanism: a conflicting agenda?." Planning Theory & Practice 8, no. 4 (2007): 449–472.
 Setiawan, Hery, Renaud Mathieu, and Michelle Thompson-Fawcett. "Assessing the applicability of the V–I–S model to map urban land use in the developing world: Case study of Yogyakarta, Indonesia." Computers, Environment and Urban Systems 30, no. 4 (2006): 503–522.
 Thompson-Fawcett, Michelle, and Sophie Bond. "Urbanist intentions for the built landscape: examples of concept and practice in England, Canada and New Zealand." Progress in Planning 60, no. 2 (2003): 147–234.

References

Living people
New Zealand women academics
Year of birth missing (living people)
Alumni of the University of Oxford
Academic staff of the University of Otago
New Zealand Māori academics
New Zealand geographers
New Zealand Māori women academics
Fellows of the Royal Society of New Zealand